Joanna, Joanne, Jo or Joan Moore may refer to:

Joanna P. Moore (1832–1916), American Baptist missionary
Joan Moore (phytopathologist) Moore (1920–1986), English plant pathologist, science administrator and conservationist
Joanna Moore (1934–1997), American film and TV actress
Joan Moore (gymnast) (born 1954), American Olympian in 1972, US Champion
Jo Moore (born 1963), British Special Advisor (List of political scandals in the United Kingdom#2000s)
Joanne Moore (born 1976), English-born American tennis player and coach, a/k/a Joanne Wallen